WOW Hits 2017 is a two-disc compilation album that features some of the biggest songs that were released to Christian Radio during the years 2015 and 2016.

It is also available in digital format from places like Apple's iTunes Store, Google Play Store, Spotify.com, and Christianbooks.com digital music store. They have both the regular edition and the deluxe edition.

The regular and deluxe editions CDs are available at Amazon.com, Walmart, Christianbooks.com, Target, and other retailers.

It was released by Capitol Christian Music Group, Provident Label Group LLC, a division of Sony Music Entertainment, LLC, a Warner/Curb Company.

It was released on September 23, 2016. The genre of the album is Christian & Gospel. The genres of the songs on the albums range from pop to the Christian Genres.

As of October 29, 2016, WOW Hits 2017 had sold in excess of 8,000 copies, according to Nielsen Music.

Track listing 

This is the track list for the regular edition and the tracklist for the deluxe edition of the album. It also includes the artist that recorded the song, length of the track, and the total length of the album, as well as the original album that the song appeared on.

Chart performance 
WOW Hits 2017 reached number 1 on the "Billboard's Top Christian Album Chart (dated Oct. 29)". It spent 3 weeks at its peak (number 1), and it spent 56 weeks on the chart.

It re-entered the Billboard Charts on December 30, 2017, when it was number 50 on the Top Christian Albums Chart For December 30. It stayed on the charts until January 6, 2018, when it finished at number 48 on the Top Christian Albums Chart for Billboard Magazine.

The album finished the year 2017 as the number 7 album in the year-end charts in the Top Christian Albums category from Billboard Magazine. It also finished the year 2016 as the number 30 album in the year-end charts in the "Top Christian ALbums" category from Billboard Magazine.

It was ranked the number 25 album on the Top Christian Albums chart on Billboard Magazine.

References 

2017